Love Is All You Need (Lit.: The Bald Hairdresser) is a 2012 Danish romantic comedy film directed by Susanne Bier and starring Pierce Brosnan and Trine Dyrholm.

Plot
Danish hairdresser Ida (Trine Dyrholm), who has recently completed a successful breast cancer treatment after undergoing a mastectomy, returns home to find her husband Leif having an affair with his accountant, Tilde. In a different part of Copenhagen,
English businessman Philip (Pierce Brosnan) is a successful exporter of fruits and vegetables who has become misanthropic after the death of his wife.

Meanwhile, Ida's daughter Astrid and Philip's son Patrick have gone to Italy to prepare Patrick's family's villa for their wedding, which is to take place only three months after they met.

Ida is in denial about her husband leaving her. She intends to travel alone to Italy for the wedding, but at Copenhagen airport, she bumps into Philip for the first time (her car collides with Philip's). After he shouts at her for being a reckless driver, he realizes she is Astrid's mother, and the two travel the rest of the way to the villa together. They do not have a favourable view of one another, as Philip finds Ida irritating, while Ida thinks that Philip is rude and mean.

At the villa, drama ensues when Leif brings his new girlfriend, Tilde, to the wedding and everyone is surprised when she introduces herself as his fiancée. Upset, Ida goes for a swim in the cove near the house. Philip sees her swimming nude and runs to urge her out of the water as the current can be dangerous. On their walk home, he shows her the groves of lemon and orange trees on the estate.

Philip begins to feel attracted to Ida's warm and sunny personality, and eventually confides the way in which his wife died to her. He also rejects the advances of Benedikte, his sister-in-law. At a celebration before the wedding, Philip dances with Ida. He allows Leif to cut in, but after he pushes Ida around, their son comes to Ida's rescue and punches Leif. Philip then tells Ida she's beautiful and wonderful, but they are interrupted by Benedikte.

Back at the party, Patrick sees Astrid grinding on Alessandro, a hired hand at the villa. He breaks them apart, but Astrid tells him that he is gay. When he goes to apologize to Alessandro, the two end up kissing.

The morning of the wedding, Patrick disappears. Philip finds him and Patrick confesses that he doesn't want to marry and only did it in part because he thought it was something Philip would want him to do. Before the ceremony, Patrick and Astrid inform the guests they will not be getting married. Ida goes to comfort Astrid, and Philip comforts Patrick. Philip is able to say goodbye to Ida before she leaves, but they do not say anything of consequence.

Sometime later, after arriving back in Denmark, Ida comes home to a house filled with roses. Leif tells Ida he still loves her and apologizes to her for leaving her for Tilde. Philip meanwhile finds his life cold and unsatisfactory. He goes to visit Ida at the salon where she works and tells her that he is cutting back on his workload and moving to Italy. He asks Ida to come and visit him. Ida tells him that Leif has moved back and that she loves him. Back at home, Ida realizes she no longer loves Leif and dumps him.

Ida goes to Italy, ditching her wig and wearing her short hair, which is growing back from chemo. She goes to Italy, where she finds Philip, who has gone back to working in the lemon orchard on his estate. She asks him to sit with her while she opens a letter from the hospital, giving her latest test results. Philip and Ida kiss before they open the letter. After reading the results, they smile and then kiss again.

Cast
 Pierce Brosnan as Philip
 Trine Dyrholm as Ida
 Kim Bodnia as Leif
 Paprika Steen as Benedikte
  as Patrick
  as Astrid
  as Tilde
 Micky Skeel Hansen as Kenneth
 Bodil Jørgensen as Lizzie
 Line Kruse as Bitten
 Ciro Petrone as Alessandro

Location
The southern Italian scenes were shot in Sorrento and on the Amalfi Coast.

Soundtrack
The film's soundtrack features multiple versions of the song "That's Amore".

Reception
Love Is All You Need has a 75% approval rating on Rotten Tomatoes and a 60/100 average on Metacritic.

Awards and accolades
In 2013, Love Is All You Need was selected as best comedy film at the 26th European Film Awards.

References

External links

Love Is All You Need at Dog And Wolf

2012 films
2012 romantic comedy films
European Film Awards winners (films)
Danish LGBT-related films
Films about cancer
Films about weddings
Swedish romantic comedy films
Swedish LGBT-related films
Italian romantic comedy films
Italian LGBT-related films
French LGBT-related films
French romantic comedy films
German LGBT-related films
German romantic comedy films
2010s Danish-language films
2010s English-language films
English-language Danish films
English-language Swedish films
English-language French films
English-language German films
English-language Italian films
2010s Italian-language films
Films directed by Susanne Bier
Films with screenplays by Anders Thomas Jensen
Adultery in films
Films set in Copenhagen
Films set in Italy
Films shot in Denmark
Films shot in Italy
Danish independent films
Sony Pictures Classics films
Swedish independent films
Italian independent films
French independent films
German independent films
Zentropa films
Danish romantic comedy films
LGBT-related romantic comedy films
2012 LGBT-related films
2012 multilingual films
Danish multilingual films
Swedish multilingual films
Italian multilingual films
French multilingual films
German multilingual films
2010s French films
2010s German films
2010s Swedish films